The Russo–Susskind–Thorlacius model or RST model in short is a modification of the CGHS model to take care of conformal anomalies and render it analytically soluble. In the CGHS model, if we include Faddeev–Popov ghosts to gauge-fix diffeomorphisms in the conformal gauge, they contribute an anomaly of -24. Each matter field contributes an anomaly of 1. So, unless N=24, we will have gravitational anomalies.
To the CGHS action
, the following term

is added, where κ is either  or  depending upon whether ghosts are considered. The nonlocal term leads to nonlocality.
In the conformal gauge,
.

It might appear as if the theory is local in the conformal gauge, but this overlooks the fact that the Raychaudhuri equations are still nonlocal.

References 

Anomalies (physics)
Conformal field theory
General relativity